Fröttmaninger Berg is a hill and recreational area on the edge of Munich, Germany. The 75-metre-high hill with a wind turbine on its top is artificial, it is a former landfill site. The nearby  Holy Cross Church is the last remaining building of the abandoned village Fröttmaning, and the oldest extant church building in the city area of Munich.

References 

Hills of Bavaria
Artificial hills